Terengganu Inscription Stone (Jawi: باتو برسورت ترڠݢانو) is a granite stele carrying Classical Malay inscription in Jawi script that was found in Terengganu, Malaysia. The inscription, dated possibly to 702 AH (corresponds to 1303 CE), constituted the earliest evidence of Jawi writing in the Malay world of Southeast Asia, and was one of the oldest testimonies to the advent of Islam as a state religion in the region. It contains the proclamation issued by a ruler of Terengganu known as Seri Paduka Tuan, urging his subjects to extend and uphold Islam and providing 10 basic Sharia laws for their guidance.

The stone was found half-submerged by a bank of Tersat river in Kuala Berang, Hulu Terengganu, in 1887 CE after the floods had receded. A Terengganuan nobleman, Pengiran Anum Engku Abdul Kadir bin Engku Besar  and his tin-prospector friend, Saiyed Husin Ghulam Al Bukhari came across the stone and brought it on a raft to Kuala Terengganu where it was presented to Sultan Zainal Abidin III, and placed atop of Bukit Puteri ('Princess hill').

In 2009, a meeting of the UNESCO's International Advisory Committee (IAC) held in Barbados, included the Inscribed Stone of Terengganu in a heritage list of Memory of the World Programme, making it the fourth heritage recognition accorded to Malaysia after the Hikayat Hang Tuah, Sejarah Melayu, and the correspondence of Sultan Abdul Hamid in 2001.

History
With the advent of Islam into Southeast Asia in the 10th or 11th century, a life based on the teachings of Quran and the Hadith became widespread and together with this, the use of the Arabic script. It was written by Yang di Pertuan Nagara Kedah Pasai Ma Maulana Kaifa Ali called Raja Mandalika in Islamic Siamese Language means our king well in sells. Over the time, the script was modified and adapted to suit the spoken Classical Malay language, and thus Jawi script was created. This development heralded a new age of literacy, when converts to the new faith gradually replaced the previous Indian-derived scripts with Jawi, in expressing their new belief.

As a testimony to the spread of Islam that originated from the Middle East, the artefact offers more than just a glimpse of the life of the people of the era. It also depicted the growing Islamic culture subsumed under a set of religious laws. A concomitant feature of this historic movement was the growth of maritime trade that centred around Kuala Berang, the place where the stone was discovered. The inscribed stone alludes to regional trade that flourished in the course of Islamisation, with its trading pattern and movement of peoples during that time.

While the Islamisation of Terengganu was pursued effectively with the rise of the new way of thinking, it did not completely put an end to the old way of life. The inscribed stone still contained a number of Sanskrit terms, a memorial to Southeast Asia's Hindu past.

Discovery
The inscribed stone was first discovered by villagers at a steep sloping riverbank of Tersat river, Kampung Buluh, Kuala Berang, Hulu Terengganu in 1887, and was later brought to a nearby surau, known as Surau Tok Rashid. From there, the stone was further moved to Surau Kampung Buluh. In 1902, a Terengganuan nobleman, Pengiran Anum Engku Abdul Kadir bin Engku Besar and his Tin-prospector friend, Syed Husin bin Ghulam Al-Bokhari, came to Kampung Buluh. While they were at Surau Kampung Buluh to perform the Zuhr prayer, they noticed a stone with inscriptions used as a pedestal by the villagers, to step onto before entering the main prayer hall. After the prayer, they requested Penghulu Ali and his villagers to carry the stone on a raft to be brought to the capital, Kuala Terengganu. When it reached Kuala Terengganu, the stone was presented to Sultan Zainal Abidin III who ordered it to be placed atop of Bukit Puteri ('princess hill'), near to the royal palace.

The stone remained on top of the hill for 20 years, until July 1922, when the Deputy British adviser of Terengganu, Major H.S Peterson asked a Japanese photographer, N. Suzuki, to take images of the inscription and send them to C.O Bledgen to be analyzed. In 1923, British adviser to Terengganu, J.L Humphreys acquired approval from the Government of Terengganu to lend the stone to Raffles Museum, Singapore. The stone remained in Singapore for 37 years until 1960, when it was relocated to the National Museum of Malaysia.

The State Government of Terengganu have been lobbying for the repatriation of the Inscribed Stone to its home state since 1979. On 12 February 1987, the Terengganu officially wrote to the administration of the National Museum, seeking permission to relocate the Inscribed Stone to their State Museum. Only in 1991, the Federal Cabinet granted approval to the request and the Inscribed Stone was returned to Terengganu. It is now displayed at the Terengganu State Museum.

Date of the inscription
The inscription is dated, however due to damage on the lower left edge of the stone, where the year of the inscription is mentioned in the 11th lines, the date is incomplete and can be variously read as ranging from 702 to 789  A.H. (1303 to 1387 CE).  C.O. Blagden, who first deciphered the inscription, presented many possible dates that range from February – March 1303 CE to February 1387 CE. He doubted that the earlier date Rajab, 702 AH or 1303 CE would be correct, and concluded that on general grounds he was inclined to lean towards the latest possible date.

This dating was challenged by Syed Muhammad Naguib al-Attas, who argued that the earlier date is the correct one through an variety of logical, mathematical, linguistic, cultural, philosophical and mystical arguments, and by attempting to reconstruct the lost part of the inscription. In his speech published by the National Museum of Malaysia, Naguib stated that the correct date of the inscription is Friday, 4th of Rajab, 702 A.H., that corresponds to Friday, 22 February 1303 CE. His assertion is based on the following explanation.

The year 702 AH began on 26 August 1303 CE. The day on which the Christian Julian calendar year began for that Islamic calendar year was a Monday (i.e. 1 January 1303 CE was a Monday, and 237 days had elapsed in the Christian year when the Islamic year began on the 1st of Muharram (i.e. 26 August 1302 CE). Rajab is the 7th month of the Islamic calendar, and since the year 702 AH began in August 1302 CE, it therefore occurred in the month of February 1303 CE, which Christian year began on a Tuesday. Bearing in mind that the Christian year began on a Tuesday, it is found that only the 4th day of Rajab, which was the 181st day of the Islamic year 702, agrees with our computation of the date. Moreover, the 4th of Rajab confirms our computation because it was a Friday of Rajab, as mentioned in the inscription.

Content
The stone is 89 cm in height, 53 cm in width at the top, and weighs 214.8 kg. All of its four facades have inscriptions written from right to left. The inscription is in Classical Malay written in the Jawi script, with dots for most of the Arabic-derived letters ( ب ، ت ، ج ، ش ، ق ، ن ، ي ) and native Jawi letters ( چ ، ݢ ، ڠ ، ڤ ), being not visible, except for the letters ( ڽ ، ض ، ف ).

Jawi spelling system
The spelling system of the Inscribed Stone of Terengganu has similarities with modern Jawi spelling system in a number of areas:
 Use of the Letters tāʼ marbūṭah (ة) and tāʼ maftūḥah (ت) - For present-day spelling, Dewan Bahasa dan Pustaka has determined that the /t/ sound in Malay words should be denoted in Jawi script by tāʼ maftūḥah, whereas the /t/ sound in words particularly special nouns, borrowed from Arabic should be retained in its original form with tāʼ marbūṭah, except for common words that have been absorbed by and are regularly used in Malay such as rakyat (people) ( رعيت ), nikmat (grace) ( نعمت ), hikmat (wisdom) ( حکمت ) and berkat (blessing) ( برکت ). This system was established in the Inscribed Stone as per below table, where Arabic loanword which is a special noun, Jumaat (Friday) (جمعة) does not change.

 Use of the Letter Qāf (ق) in final closed syllables - In the present-day Jawi spelling system, all glottal stops in final closed syllables of Malay words are spelt with qāf, while the consonant sound /k/ in the final closed syllable of English loanwords is spelled with kāf such as abstrak (abstract) ( ابسترک ), plastik (plastic) ( ڤلستيک ) and kek (cake) ( كيک ). For Arabic loan words, the spelling of the source language is maintained such as for isyak ( عشاء ), imsak (the time to stop suhoor slightly before Fajr) ( امساک ), rujuk (refer) ( روجوع ) and talak (divorce) ( طلاق ). Some of the glottal stops in final closed syllables represented by letter qāf in the Inscribed Stone, are shown in the following table.

 Use of the Letter Nya (ڽ) - Based on the consonants found on the Terengganu Inscribed Stone, there were consonant sounds in Classical Malay that were not found in the Arabic alphabet. Letters of this type include ca (چ) in acara (event) ( احارا ), nga (ڠ) in dengan (with) ( دعں ), pa (ڤ) in pada (to) ( فدا ), ga (ݢ) in pinggang (waist) ( ڡعكع ), and nya (ڽ) in denda-nya (the penalty) ( داٮداڽ ). However, a special feature of the Terengganu Stone is the use of the letter nya. It is exquisitely written with three dots above it, making it the oldest known Jawi letter.

References

Bibliography

 
 
 
 
 
 
 
 
 

14th-century inscriptions
1887 archaeological discoveries
Archaeology of Malaysia
History of Terengganu
Islam in Malaysia
Malaysian literature
Steles
Islamic inscriptions
Malay inscriptions
Memory of the World Register